Tardo may refer to:
tardo ("slow"), a now obsolete tempo marking in music
 Tardo Hammer (born 1958), American jazz pianist
 Manuel Rodulfo Tardo (1913–1998), Cuban artist

See also
 Tardos (disambiguation)